Esoteric is the fourth studio album by Swedish metal band Skyfire. It was released on 14 September in the United Kingdom, 18 September for the rest of Europe and October 13, 2009 in North America, through Pivotal Rockordings. The cover artwork was made by Pär Olofsson who also created the artwork for other acts such as The Faceless, Psycroptic and Spawn of Possession along with the layout by Erik Olofsson of Cult of Luna. Martin Hanner revealed that the album is a concept album and that "The cover is basically a guy who is being initiated by a cult," he further responded with: 

The band was also going for an epic sound inspired by the likes of Symphony X and Bal-Sagoth. A choir and orchestra was said to be added to their overall sound but it is unclear as to what extent they would be used. As for bonus tracks, the band and label decided on releasing material previously unheard by the public from their demo Within Reach. At this time, the band used clean vocals as opposed to growling vocals.

The album has been distributed via Koch Distribution, in cooperation with Listenable Records. The album encountered a delay for the North American release due to a scheduling issue.

Track listing

Personnel

Band members
Joakim Karlsson – vocals
Martin Hanner – bass guitar, keyboards
Andreas Edlund – guitar, keyboards
Johan Reinholdz – guitar
Joakim Jonsson – drums

Artwork
Cover artwork by Pär Olofsson
Layout by Erik Olofsson (Cult of Luna)

Release history

References

2009 albums
Skyfire (band) albums
Concept albums
Albums with cover art by Pär Olofsson